The Armscor M1600 is a semi-automatic rifle made by Armscor (formerly Squires Bingham Co.). The rifle bears a resemblance to the Colt M16 family of firearms but is chambered in .22 LR.  As they are two entirely different firearms, there is no interchangeability of parts.

There are some prominent differences between the two. For example, the carry handle on the M16 22 is considerably smaller and moved farther forward along the body of the rifle than the Colt, and the stock of the Armscor model is made of wood as opposed to plastic. There is also a model with a collapsible stock (designated M1600R). The rifle was conceived out of want of an M16-like rifle in .22 caliber. This is a reasonably accurate semi-automatic rifle for plinking.

As compared to the Colt M16 the M1600 has very much less recoil  making it easy to handle. This rifle is suitable for hunting small game.

External links
 Armscor M1600

References

.22 LR semi-automatic rifles